{{DISPLAYTITLE:C12H21N5O3}}
The molecular formula C12H21N5O3 (molar mass: 283.33 g/mol, exact mass: 283.1644 u) may refer to:

 Cadralazine
 Choline theophyllinate, also known as oxtriphylline